Otene Pitau (born Otene Pitau Halbert, 1834 – 13 August 1921) was a New Zealand Māori leader. Of Māori descent, he identified with the Rongowhakaata iwi. He was born in New Zealand in about 1834.

References

1834 births
1921 deaths
Rongowhakaata people
Halbert-Kohere family